Law Ting Pong Secondary School (LTPSS) is a co-educational EMI school located in Tai Po, Hong Kong. It was founded in 1991 by Law's Foundation Limited and actively promotes its aims and educational philosophy. The school successfully gained support and recognition from parents, as reflected by the number of elite students enrolled in the school. In order to further pursue the school's educational ideals, LTPSS will be operated under the Direct Subsidy Scheme (DSS) from the academic year 2008/09 onwards.

External links 

 Official site

Direct Subsidy Scheme schools
Educational institutions established in 1991
Secondary schools in Hong Kong
1991 establishments in Hong Kong